Myloplus torquatus is a medium to large omnivorous fish of the family Serrasalmidae from South America, where it is found in the Amazon, the Rio Negro and the Orinoco basins. 
They are also called the silver dollar and are one of the fish referred to as "silver dollars".  
These fish are capable of delivering serious bites to humans.

References

Ferreira, E.J.G., J. Zuanon and G.M. dos Santos, 1996. A list of commercial fish species from Santarém, State of Pará, Brazil. Naga ICLARM Q. 19(3):41-44.

Serrasalmidae
Freshwater fish of Brazil
Fish of the Amazon basin
Taxa named by Rudolf Kner
Fish described in 1858